Emily Visagie (born 8 January 1998)  is a South African swimmer. She competed at the 2014 FINA World Swimming Championships, in the 50, 100, and 200m breaststroke events. In 2015, she participated in the FINA World Junior Swimming Championships. She competed at the 2018 Commonwealth Games, reaching the semifinal in the 100m breaststroke and the finals in the 200m breaststroke, finishing in 7th. She also competed at the 2018 FINA World Swimming Championships.

References

1998 births
Living people
South African female swimmers
Swimmers at the 2018 Commonwealth Games
Commonwealth Games competitors for South Africa
Competitors at the 2017 Summer Universiade
20th-century South African women
21st-century South African women